Rhonda Software is a privately held camera software and hardware design company that specializes in embedded solutions in the areas of digital image processing, multimedia and connectivity. Rhonda's solutions are used in surveillance applications, action cameras, virtual reality cameras, wearable video recorders, drone cameras, automotive and robotic vision systems and other camera applications.

As of 2022, the company has over 100 engineers, headquartered in the United States (Chicago) with main development office in Kazakhstan (Almaty).

History 
The company was founded in 1995 as a provider of software outsourcing services. The foundation of the company was an initiative of technology-driven enthusiasts with expertise in different engineering domains. In 2004, Rhonda was certified as a SEI CMM level 4. Since 2007 the company has been doing R&D in the area of computer vision.  In 2011, Rhonda introduced its first computer vision solutions myAudience-Count and myAudience-Measure - audience count and classification tools.

Since 2014, Rhonda Software is a camera design partner of Ambarella, Inc. The company demonstrated its H22 SoM with a camera demo design at the CES 2020 Expo and participated in the Embedded World 2020 Expo in the same year. A cooperation with VisionLabs engineers allowed to use their face recognition algorithm in order to execute DNN inference and train the network onboard. In 2021, Rhonda Software established a partnership with Brodmann17 and launched an ADAS camera platform based on Ambarella CV25 edge AI vision System on a Chip. At CES 2022, the company showcased the CV2 System on a Module multi-camera solution running pose detection, activity recognition and person re-identification for demonstration purposes.

Expertise & Technologies 

 System on a Module
 Image Quality Tuning
 Computer Vision Pruning
 Electrical Engineering
 Software Development
 System Engineering
 Radio Frequency Design
 Mechanical Engineering Design
 Quality Assurance
 Software Test Automation
 Manufacturing Support
 Embedded Debugging
 Mobile Applications
 Cloud Computing

Partner Ecosystem 
 SoC: Ambarella: List of Ambarella products
 Wi-fi/Bluetooth: Cypress, Murata
 Image sensors: Sony LSI Design Inc
 Memory modules: Micron
 Lenses: Sunex
 Distributors: Framos,<ref name="Framos Rhonda" , Macnica <ref name="Macnica Rhonda"

References 

Software companies based in Illinois